Monochamus notatus, the northeastern pine sawyer or notable sawyer, is a species of beetle in the family Cerambycidae. It was described by Dru Drury in 1773, originally under the genus Cerambyx. It is known from Canada and the United States.

The species is native to North America.

References

notatus
Beetles described in 1773
Taxa named by Dru Drury